Rugby union, often simply referred to as rugby, is a full contact team sport which originated in England in the early 19th century. One of the two codes of rugby football, it is based on running with the ball in hand.

As of 2011, more than 5 million people currently play rugby union in more than 117 countries.

Algeria
 Boumedienne Allam

Argentina
For the full list of Argentina international rugby players see: List of Argentina national rugby union players

Australia
For the full list of Australia international rugby players see: List of Australia national rugby union players

Austria
Mani Dehimi

Belgium
 Jacques Rogge

Brazil
 João Luiz da Ros
 Charles William Miller
 Paulo do Rio Branco

Canada
Dan Baugh
Mark Cardinal
Al Charron
Jamie Cudmore
Glen Ennis
Norm Hadley
Mike James
Dave Lougheed
Gord MacKinnon
Gareth Rees
Bobby Ross (rugby union)
Rod Snow
Winston Stanley
Christian Stewart
John Tait (rugby union)
Kevin Tkachuk
D. T. H. van der Merwe
Morgan Williams
Nik Witkowski
Colin Yukes

Chile
 Ian Campbell
 Sergio Valdes

Cook Islands
 Tommy Hayes
 Albert Henry
 Stan Wright

Côte d'Ivoire/Ivory Coast
 Max Brito

Czech Republic
 Martin Jágr

Denmark
 Nico Vermaak

Democratic Republic of the Congo
 Yannick Nyanga

England
For the full list of English international rugby players see: List of England national rugby union players

Fiji
For the full list of Fiji international rugby players see: List of Fiji national rugby union players

France
For the full list of France international rugby players see: List of France national rugby union players

Georgia
For the full list of Georgia international rugby players see: List of Georgia national rugby union players

Germany
For the full list of Germany international rugby players see: List of Germany national rugby union players

Greece
 Nicholas Alamanos

Haiti
 Constantin Henriquez

Hong Kong
For the full list of Hong Kong international rugby players see: List of Hong Kong national rugby union players

India
 Rahul Bose
 Nasser Hussain (rugby union)
 Pendse

Ireland
For the full list of Irish international rugby players see: List of Ireland national rugby union players

Italy
For the full list of Italy international rugby players see: List of Italy national rugby union players

Japan
 Takeomi Ito
 Takuro Miuchi
 Kyohei Morita
 Yukio Motoki
 Daisuke Ohata
 Hirotoki Onozawa
 Adam Parker
 Yuya Saito
 Ruatangi Vatuvei
 Ayumu Goromaru

Kenya
 Biko Adema
 Peter Karia
 Innocent Simiyu

Luxembourg
For the full list of Luxembourg international rugby players see: List of Luxembourg national rugby union players

Morocco
 Abdelatif Benazzi
 Djalil Narjissi

Namibia
 Tinus du Plessis
 Piet van Zyl
 Bratley Langenhoven
 Jacques Nieuwenhuis
 Percy Montgomery
 Rohan Kitshoff

New Zealand
For the full list of New Zealand international rugby players see: List of New Zealand national rugby union players.
Other New Zealand rugby union players include Daryl Halligan, Toni Konui and Albert Henry Baskerville.

Nigeria
Owolabi Adele
 Victor Ubogu*
 Daniel Norton**
 Marcus Watson**
 Ugo Monye*
 Ayoola Erinle*
 Topsy Ojo*
 Joseph Mbu
 Mark Odejobi**
 Steve Ojomoh*
 Uche Oduoza*
 David Akinluyi
 Temitope Okenla
 Tiwaloluwa Obisesan
 James Doherty
 Nsa Harrison
 Ejike Uzoigbe
 Francis Ugwu
 Robert Worrincy
 William Sharp
 Kene Ejikeme
 Chukwuma Osazuwa
 Emmanuel Akinluyi
 James Davies
 Michael Worrincy
 Ade Adebisi
 Salim Abdulmailk
 Obi Wilson
 Nde Monye
 Aliyu Shelleng
 Nuhu Ibrahim
 Aristide Goualin
 Mark Olugbode
 Craig Olugbode
 Ovie Koloko
 Martin Olima

 * denotes capped by England
 ** denotes capped by England 7s

Matt Faleuka
 Toni Pulu

Papua New Guinea
 Will Genia
 Henari Veratau

Portugal

Duarte Cardoso Pinto
José Pinto
Vasco Uva

Romania
For the full list of Romania international rugby players see: List of Romania national rugby union players.

Russia
 Igor Galinovskiy
 Alexander Obolenski

(Western) Samoa
 Frank Bunce
 Va'aiga Tuigamala ("Inga the Winger")
 Freddie Tuilagi
 Apollo Perelini
 Lome Fa'atau
 Pat Lam
 Trevor Leota
 Brian Lima
 Earl Va'a
 Alesana Tuilagi
 Ofisa Treviranus
 Census Johnston
 Mahonri Schwalger
 Kane Thompson
 Daniel Leo

Scotland
See: List of Scottish rugby union players

Singapore
 Billy King

South Africa
For the full list of South African international rugby players see: List of South Africa national rugby union players

Spain
Francisco Puertas Soto (1963 - )
Oriol Ripol (1975 - )

Mahesh Rodrigo

Soviet Union
 B.P. Gavrilov
 A.G. Grigor'iants
 I.I. Kiziriya
 Dimitri Mironov
 Alexandre Tichonov

Tonga
For the full list of Tonga international rugby players see: List of Tonga national rugby union players

Idi Amin

United States of America
For the full list of USA international rugby players see: List of USA national rugby union players

Uruguay

For the full list of Uruguay international rugby players see: List of Uruguay national rugby union players

Venezuela
 Serge Blanco

Wales
For the full list of Welsh international rugby players see: List of Wales national rugby union players

Zambia
 George Gregan
 Corné Krige

Zimbabwe
 Tonderai Chavhanga
 Takudzwa Ngwenya
 Tendai Mtawarira

See also
 International Rugby Hall of Fame

References